Alfred James Jolson, S.J., (June 18, 1928 – March 21, 1994) was an American prelate of the Roman Catholic Church and former Bishop of the Diocese of Reykjavík, Iceland.

After several years of teaching in various Jesuit educational institutions in the United States (including Saint Joseph's University, Philadelphia), Italy,   and Iraq, Jolson was appointed to the Diocese of Reykjavík by Pope John Paul II in 1987. Jolson died suddenly in 1994.

See also
Bishop of Reykjavík
Diocese of Reykjavík
Christ the King Cathedral, Reykjavík (Iceland)
Roman Catholicism in Iceland
Christianity in Iceland

References

External links
Roman Catholic Diocese of Reykjavík 

People from Bridgeport, Connecticut
20th-century American Jesuits
Jesuit bishops
American Roman Catholic priests
Saint Joseph's University faculty
20th-century Roman Catholic bishops in Iceland
1928 births
1994 deaths
Icelandic Jesuits
Roman Catholic bishops of Reykjavík
Catholics from Connecticut
Wheeling University faculty
Pontifical Gregorian University alumni
Boston College alumni
Harvard Business School alumni